Islamic art is collected by museums, galleries and private collectors in many countries around the world.

See also 

Lists of museums

References 

museums
Islamic art
list
Islamic Art